Lepocreadiidae is a family of trematodes in the order Plagiorchiida.

Genera
According to the World Register of Marine Species, the family includes the following valid genera:

 Acanthogalea Gibson, 1976
 Amphicreadium Bray & Cribb, 2001
 Bianium Stunkard, 1930
 Cephalolepidapedon Yamaguti, 1970
 Clavogalea Bray, 1985
 Cliveus Bray & Cribb, 1997
 Cotylocreadium Madhavi, 1972
 Deraiotrema Machida, 1982
 Dermadena Manter, 1945
 Dihemistephanus Looss, 1901
 Diplocreadium Park, 1939
 Diploproctia Mamaev, 1970
 Diploproctodaeoides Reimer, 1981
 Diploproctodaeum La Rue, 1926
 Echeneidocoelium Simha & Pershad, 1964
 Gibsonius Hassanine, 2005
 Hypocreadium Ozaki, 1936
 Hypoporus Wang, 1989
 Lepidapedoides Yamaguti, 1970
 Lepocreadioides Yamaguti, 1936
 Lepocreadium Stossich, 1904
 Lepotrema Ozaki, 1932
 Lobatocreadium Madhavi, 1972
 Lutianotrema Singh, Singh & Singh, 2004
 Mobahincia Bray, Cribb & Cutmore, 2018
 Multitestis Manter, 1931
 Multitestoides Yamaguti, 1971
 Neodiploproctodaeum Bilqees, Khalil, Khan & Haseeb, 2012
 Neohypocreadium Machida & Uchida, 1987
 Neolabrifer Pritchard, 1972
 Neolepidapedoides Yamaguti, 1971
 Neomultitestis Machida, 1982
 Neopreptetos Machida, 1982
 Opechona Looss, 1907
 Opechonoides Yamaguti, 1940
 Opisthogonoporoides Madhavi, 1972
 Opisthogonoporus Yamaguti, 1937
 Pelopscreadium Dronen, Blend, Khalifa, Mohamadain & Karer, 2016
 Potamogenes Feng & Wang, 1993
 Preptetos Pritchard, 1960
 Prodistomum Linton, 1910
 Pseudocreadium Layman, 1930
 Pseudoholorchis Yamaguti, 1958
 Pseudolepocreadioides Hafeezullah, 1970
 Pseudopisthogonoporus Yamaguti, 1970
 Rhagorchis Manter, 1931
 Rugocavum Bray & Cribb, 1997
 Transversocreadium Hafeezullah, 1970
 Trigonotrema Goto & Ozaki, 1929

References

Plagiorchiida
Trematode families